On Thin Ice may also refer to:
On Thin Ice (comedy group), an improvisational comedy group from Harvard
On Thin Ice (TV series), a documentary covering a race across Antarctica to reach the South Pole
"On Thin Ice", the final episode of the BBC nature documentary Frozen Planet
On Thin Ice (1925 film), a silent lost film
On Thin Ice (1933 film), a British crime film
On Thin Ice (1966 film), a Soviet spy film

See also

Thin ice (disambiguation)
Treddin' on Thin Ice, a 2004 album by Wiley